KF Gostivari is a football club based in Gostivar, North Macedonia. They are currently competing in the Macedonian Second League.

History
The club was founded in 1998 FK Gostivar., not to be related with FK Gostivar 1919 which was disloved in 2010.

In the 2012–13 season, Gostivar finished second and was promoted to the Macedonian First League for the first time in club history.

Its first win in 2013/14 season was on 18/08/2013 against FK Rabotnički. Gostivar's defender Ekrem Hodžić scored two goals contributing in the 2–0 win.

Current squad
As of 1 January 2023.

Honours
 Macedonian Second League:
Runners-up (1): 2012–13

References

External links
Official Website 
Club info at MacedonianFootball 
Football Federation of Macedonia 

 
Football clubs in North Macedonia
1919 establishments in Yugoslavia
Gostivar
Gostivari